Kinnekulle is a flat-topped mountain in the county of Västergötland, Sweden, on the eastern shore of lake Vänern.

Geology 

Despite its enormous size, Kinnekulle is actually the smaller remnant of a much larger plateau, long ago worn down to a flat plain. Some 550 million years ago, in the Neoproterozoic Era, the bottom-most rock of the plateau was under the sea. Layers of sedimentary rock formed over that layer from sand, mud, and sea animal remains.

About 200 million years ago, during the Mesozoic era, the area was uplifted above the sea. Tectonic activity forced molten lava through the sedimentary rock, creating sheetlike layers of diabase. These layers, when present, protected the softer sedimentary rock beneath them from erosion, resulting in mesa-like mountains such as Kinnekulle and its neighbours.

History 
The historic town and church of Husaby are located on the south side of the Kinnekulle. Tradition says that Olof Skötkonung, the first Christian King of Sweden, was baptized here in 1008 at a well located just north of the church.

The mountain of Kinnefjellet at Spitsbergen, Svalbard, is named after Kinnekulle.

References

External links 

 Kinnekulle - Turistportal
 Sweden travel guide

Hills of Sweden
Landforms of Västra Götaland County